Johannes Brahms (7 May 1833 – 3 April 1897) was a German composer, pianist, and conductor of the mid-Romantic period. Born in Hamburg into a Lutheran family, he spent much of his professional life in Vienna. He is sometimes grouped with Johann Sebastian Bach and Ludwig van Beethoven as one of the "Three Bs" of music, a comment originally made by the nineteenth-century conductor Hans von Bülow.

Brahms composed for symphony orchestra, chamber ensembles, piano, organ, violin, voice, and chorus. A virtuoso pianist, he premiered many of his own works. He worked with leading performers of his time, including the pianist Clara Schumann and the violinist Joseph Joachim (the three were close friends). Many of his works have become staples of the modern concert repertoire.

Brahms has been considered both a traditionalist and an innovator, by his contemporaries and by later writers. His music is rooted in the structures and compositional techniques of the Classical masters. Embedded within those structures are deeply Romantic motifs. While some contemporaries found his music to be overly academic, his contribution and craftsmanship were admired by subsequent figures as diverse as Arnold Schoenberg and Edward Elgar. The detailed construction of Brahms's works was a starting point and an inspiration for a generation of composers.

Life

Early years (1833–1850)

Brahms's father, Johann Jakob Brahms (1806–72), was from the town of Heide in Holstein. The family name was also sometimes spelt 'Brahmst' or 'Brams', and derives from 'Bram', the German word for the shrub broom. Against the family's will, Johann Jakob pursued a career in music, arriving in Hamburg in 1826, where he found work as a jobbing musician and a string and wind player. In 1830, he married Johanna Henrika Christiane Nissen (1789–1865), a seamstress 17 years older than he was. In the same year he was appointed as a horn player in the Hamburg militia. Eventually he became a double-bass player in the Stadttheater Hamburg and the Hamburg Philharmonic Society. As Johann Jakob prospered, the family moved over the years to ever better accommodation in Hamburg. Johannes Brahms was born in 1833; his sister Elisabeth (Elise) had been born in 1831 and a younger brother Fritz Friedrich (Fritz) was born in 1835. Fritz also became a pianist; overshadowed by his brother, he emigrated to Caracas in 1867, and later returned to Hamburg as a teacher.

Johann Jakob gave his son his first musical training; Johannes also learnt to play the violin and the basics of playing the cello. From 1840 he studied piano with Otto Friedrich Willibald Cossel (1813–1865). Cossel complained in 1842 that Brahms "could be such a good player, but he will not stop his never-ending composing." At the age of 10, Brahms made his debut as a performer in a private concert including Beethoven's quintet for piano and winds Op. 16 and a piano quartet by Mozart. He also played as a solo work an étude of Henri Herz. By 1845 he had written a piano sonata in G minor. His parents disapproved of his early efforts as a composer, feeling that he had better career prospects as a performer.

From 1845 to 1848 Brahms studied with Cossel's teacher, the pianist and composer Eduard Marxsen (1806–1887). Marxsen had been a personal acquaintance of Beethoven and Schubert, admired the works of Mozart and Haydn, and was a devotee of the music of J. S. Bach. Marxsen conveyed to Brahms the tradition of these composers and ensured that Brahms's own compositions were grounded in that tradition. In 1847 Brahms made his first public appearance as a solo pianist in Hamburg, playing a fantasy by Sigismund Thalberg. His first full piano recital, in 1848, included a fugue by Bach as well as works by Marxsen and contemporary virtuosi such as Jacob Rosenhain. A second recital in April 1849 included Beethoven's Waldstein sonata and a waltz fantasia of his own composition and garnered favourable newspaper reviews.

Brahms's compositions at this period are known to have included piano music, chamber music and works for male voice choir. Under the pseudonym 'G. W. Marks', some piano arrangements and fantasies were published by the Hamburg firm of Cranz in 1849. The earliest of Brahms's works which he acknowledged (his Scherzo Op. 4 and the song Heimkehr Op. 7 no. 6) date from 1851. However, Brahms was later assiduous in eliminating all his early works;  even as late as 1880 he wrote to his friend Elise Giesemann to send him his manuscripts of choral music so that they could be destroyed.

Persistent stories of the impoverished adolescent Brahms playing in bars and brothels have only anecdotal provenance, and many modern scholars dismiss them; the Brahms family was relatively prosperous, and Hamburg legislation very strictly forbade music in, or the admittance of minors to, brothels.

Early career (1850–1862)

In 1850 Brahms met the Hungarian violinist Ede Reményi and accompanied him in a number of recitals over the next few years. This was his introduction to "gypsy-style" music such as the csardas, which was later to prove the foundation of his  most lucrative and popular compositions, the two sets of Hungarian Dances (1869 and 1880). 1850 also marked Brahms's first contact (albeit a failed one) with Robert Schumann; during Schumann's visit to Hamburg that year, friends persuaded Brahms to send the former some of his compositions, but the package was returned unopened.

In 1853 Brahms went on a concert tour with Reményi. In late May the two visited the violinist and composer Joseph Joachim at Hanover. Brahms had earlier heard Joachim playing the solo part in Beethoven's violin concerto and been deeply impressed. Brahms played some of his own solo piano pieces for Joachim, who remembered fifty years later: "Never in the course of my artist's life have I been more completely overwhelmed". This was the beginning of a friendship which was lifelong, albeit temporarily derailed when Brahms took the side of Joachim's wife in their divorce proceedings of 1883. Brahms also admired Joachim as a composer, and in 1856 they were to embark on a mutual training exercise to improve their skills in (in Brahms's words) "double counterpoint, canons, fugues, preludes or whatever". Bozarth notes that "products of Brahms's study of counterpoint and early music over the next few years included "dance pieces, preludes and fugues for organ, and neo-Renaissance and neo-Baroque choral works".

After meeting Joachim, Brahms and Reményi visited Weimar, where Brahms met Franz Liszt, Peter Cornelius, and Joachim Raff, and where Liszt performed Brahms's Op. 4 Scherzo at sight.  Reményi claimed that Brahms then slept during Liszt's performance of his own Sonata in B minor; this and other disagreements led Reményi and Brahms to part company.

Brahms visited Düsseldorf in October 1853, and, with a letter of introduction from Joachim, was welcomed by Schumann and his wife Clara. Schumann, greatly impressed and delighted by the 20-year-old's talent, published an article entitled "Neue Bahnen" ("New Paths") in the 28 October issue of the journal Neue Zeitschrift für Musik nominating Brahms as one who was "fated to give expression to the times in the highest and most ideal manner". This praise may have aggravated Brahms's self-critical standards of perfection and dented his confidence. He wrote to Schumann in November 1853 that his praise "will arouse such extraordinary expectations by the public that I don't know how I can begin to fulfil them". While in Düsseldorf, Brahms participated with Schumann and Schumann's pupil Albert Dietrich in writing a movement each of a violin sonata for Joachim, the "F-A-E Sonata", the letters representing the initials of Joachim's personal motto Frei aber einsam ("Free but lonely").

Schumann's accolade led to the first publication of Brahms's works under his own name. Brahms went to Leipzig where Breitkopf & Härtel published his Opp. 1–4 (the Piano Sonatas nos. 1 and 2, the Six Songs Op. 3, and the Scherzo Op. 4), whilst Bartholf Senff published the Third Piano Sonata Op. 5 and the Six Songs Op. 6. In Leipzig, he gave recitals including his own first two piano sonatas, and met with Ferdinand David, Ignaz Moscheles, and Hector Berlioz, among others.

After Schumann's attempted suicide and subsequent confinement in a mental sanatorium near Bonn in February 1854 (where he died of pneumonia in 1856), Brahms based himself in Düsseldorf, where he supported the household and dealt with business matters on Clara's behalf. Clara was not allowed to visit Robert until two days before his death, but Brahms was able to visit him and acted as a go-between. Brahms began to feel deeply for Clara, who to him represented an ideal of womanhood. Their intensely emotional platonic relationship lasted until Clara's death. In June 1854 Brahms dedicated to Clara his Op. 9, the Variations on a Theme of Schumann. Clara continued to support Brahms's career by programming his music in her recitals.

After the publication of his Op. 10 Ballades for piano, Brahms published no further works until 1860. His major project of this period was the Piano Concerto in D minor, which he had begun as a work for two pianos in 1854 but soon realized needed a larger-scale format. Based in Hamburg at this time, he gained, with Clara's support, a position as musician to the tiny court of Detmold, the capital of the Principality of Lippe, where he spent the winters of 1857 to 1860 and for which he wrote his two Serenades (1858 and 1859, Opp. 11 and 16). In Hamburg he established a women's choir for which he wrote music and conducted. To this period also belong his first two Piano Quartets (Op. 25 and Op. 26) and the first movement of the third Piano Quartet, which eventually appeared in 1875.

The end of the decade brought professional setbacks for Brahms. The premiere of the First Piano Concerto in Hamburg on 22 January 1859, with the composer as soloist, was poorly received. Brahms wrote to Joachim that the performance was "a brilliant and decisive – failure ... [I]t forces one to concentrate one's thoughts and increases one's courage ... But the hissing was too much of a good thing ..." At a second performance, audience reaction was so hostile that Brahms had to be restrained from leaving the stage after the first movement. As a consequence of these reactions Breitkopf and Härtel declined to take on his new compositions. Brahms consequently established a relationship with other publishers, including Simrock, who eventually became his major publishing partner. Brahms further made an intervention in 1860 in the debate on the future of German music which seriously misfired. Together with Joachim and others, he prepared an attack on Liszt's followers, the so-called "New German School" (although Brahms himself was sympathetic to the music of Richard Wagner, the School's leading light). In particular they objected to the rejection of traditional musical forms and to the "rank, miserable weeds growing from Liszt-like fantasias". A draft was leaked to the press, and the Neue Zeitschrift für Musik published a parody which ridiculed Brahms and his associates as backward-looking. Brahms never again ventured into public musical polemics.

Brahms's personal life was also troubled. In 1859 he became engaged to Agathe von Siebold. The engagement was soon broken off, but even after this Brahms wrote to her: "I love you! I must see you again, but I am incapable of bearing fetters. Please write me ... whether ... I may come again to clasp you in my arms, to kiss you, and tell you that I love you." They never saw one another again, and Brahms later confirmed to a friend that Agathe was his "last love".

Maturity (1862–1876)
Brahms had hoped to be given the conductorship of the Hamburg Philharmonic, but in 1862 this post was given to the baritone Julius Stockhausen. (Brahms continued to hope for the post; but when he was finally offered the directorship in 1893, he demurred as he had "got used to the idea of having to go along other paths".) In autumn 1862 Brahms made his first visit to Vienna, staying there over the winter. There he became an associate of two close members of Wagner's circle, his earlier friend Peter Cornelius and Karl Tausig, and of Joseph Hellmesberger Sr. and Julius Epstein, respectively the Director and head of violin studies, and the head of piano studies, at the Vienna Conservatoire. Brahms's circle grew to include the notable critic (and opponent of the 'New German School') Eduard Hanslick, the conductor Hermann Levi and the surgeon Theodor Billroth, who were to become amongst his greatest advocates.

In January 1863 Brahms met Richard Wagner for the first time, for whom he played his Handel Variations Op. 24, which he had completed the previous year. The meeting was cordial, although Wagner was in later years to make critical, and even insulting, comments on Brahms's music. Brahms however retained at this time and later a keen interest in Wagner's music, helping with preparations for Wagner's Vienna concerts in 1862/63, and being rewarded by Tausig with a manuscript of part of Wagner's Tannhäuser (which Wagner demanded back in 1875). The Handel Variations also featured, together with the first Piano Quartet, in his first Viennese recitals, in which his performances were better received by the public and critics than his music.

Although Brahms entertained the idea of taking up conducting posts elsewhere, he based himself increasingly in Vienna and soon made it his home. In 1863, he was appointed conductor of the Wiener Singakademie. He surprised his audiences by programming many works by the early German masters such as Heinrich Schütz and J. S. Bach, and other early composers such as Giovanni Gabrieli; more recent music was represented by works of Beethoven and Felix Mendelssohn. Brahms also wrote works for the choir, including his Motet, Op. 29. Finding however that the post encroached too much of the time he needed for composing, he left the choir in June 1864. From 1864 to 1876 he spent many of his summers in Lichtental, today part of Baden-Baden, where Clara Schumann and her family also spent some time. His house in Lichtental, where he worked on many of his major compositions including A German Requiem and his middle-period chamber works, is preserved as a museum.

In February 1865 Brahms's mother died, and he began to compose his large choral work A German Requiem, Op. 45, of which six movements were completed by 1866. Premieres of the first three movements were given in Vienna, but the complete work was first given in Bremen in 1868 to great acclaim. A seventh movement (the soprano solo "Ihr habt nun Traurigkeit") was added for the equally successful Leipzig premiere (February 1869). The work went on to receive concert and critical acclaim throughout Germany and also in England, Switzerland and Russia, marking effectively Brahms's arrival on the world stage. Brahms also experienced at this period popular success with works such as his first set of Hungarian Dances (1869), the Liebeslieder Waltzes, Op. 52, (1868/69), and his collections of lieder (Opp. 43 and 46–49). Following such successes he finally completed a number of works that he had wrestled with over many years such as the cantata Rinaldo (1863–1868), his first two string quartets Op. 51 nos. 1 and 2 (1865–1873), the third piano quartet (1855–1875), and most notably his first symphony which appeared in 1876, but which had been begun as early as 1855. During 1869 Brahms had felt himself falling in love with the Schumann's daughter Julie (then aged 24 to his 36) but did not declare himself; when later that year Julie's engagement to Count Marmorito was announced, he wrote and gave to Clara the manuscript of his Alto Rhapsody (Op. 53). Clara wrote in her diary that "he called it his wedding song" and noted "the profound pain in the text and the music".

From 1872 to 1875, Brahms was director of the concerts of the Vienna Gesellschaft der Musikfreunde. He ensured that the orchestra was staffed only by professionals, and conducted a repertoire which ran from Bach to the nineteenth century composers who were not of the 'New German School'; these included Beethoven, Franz Schubert, Mendelssohn, Schumann, Joachim, Ferdinand Hiller, Max Bruch and himself (notably his large scale choral works, the German Requiem, the Alto Rhapsody, and the patriotic Triumphlied, Op. 55, which celebrated Prussia's victory in the 1870/71 Franco-Prussian War). 1873 saw the premiere of his orchestral Variations on a Theme by Haydn, originally conceived for two pianos, which has become one of his most popular works.

Years of fame (1876–1890)

Brahms's first symphony, Op. 68, appeared in 1876, though it had been begun (and a version of the first movement had been announced by Brahms to Clara and to Albert Dietrich) in the early 1860s. During the decade it evolved very gradually; the finale may not have begun its conception until 1868. Brahms was cautious and typically self-deprecating about the symphony during its creation, writing to his friends that it was "long and difficult", "not exactly charming" and, significantly "long and in C Minor", which, as Richard Taruskin points out, made it clear "that Brahms was taking on the model of models [for a symphony]: Beethoven's Fifth".

In May 1876, Cambridge University offered to grant honorary degrees of Doctor of Music to both Brahms and Joachim, provided that they composed new pieces as "theses" and were present in Cambridge to receive their degrees. Brahms was averse to traveling to England, and requested to receive the degree 'in absentia', offering as his thesis the previously performed (November 1876) symphony. But of the two, only Joachim went to England and only he was granted a degree. Brahms "acknowledged the invitation" by giving the manuscript score and parts of his first symphony to Joachim, who led the performance at Cambridge 8 March 1877 (English premiere).

Despite the warm reception the first symphony received, Brahms remained dissatisfied and extensively revised the second movement before the work was published. There followed a succession of well-received orchestral works: the Second Symphony Op. 73 (1877), the Violin Concerto Op. 77 (1878), dedicated to Joachim who was consulted closely during its composition, and the Academic Festival Overture (written following the conferring of an honorary degree by the University of Breslau) and Tragic Overture of 1880. The commendation of Brahms by Breslau as "the leader in the art of serious music in Germany today" led to a bilious comment from Wagner in his essay "On Poetry and Composition": "I know of some famous composers who in their concert masquerades don the disguise of a street-singer one day, the hallelujah periwig of Handel the next, the dress of a Jewish Czardas-fiddler another time, and then again the guise of a highly respectable symphony dressed up as Number Ten" (referring to Brahms's First Symphony as a putative tenth symphony of Beethoven).

Brahms was now recognised as a major figure in the world of music. He had been on the jury which awarded the Vienna State Prize to the (then little-known) composer Antonín Dvořák three times, first in February 1875, and later in 1876 and 1877 and had successfully recommended Dvořák to his publisher, Simrock. The two men met for the first time in 1877, and Dvořák dedicated to Brahms his String Quartet, Op. 34 of that year. He also began to be the recipient of a variety of honours; Ludwig II of Bavaria awarded him the Maximilian Order for Science and Art in 1874, and the music loving Duke George of Meiningen awarded him in 1881 the Commander's Cross of the Order of the House of Meiningen.

At this time Brahms also chose to change his image. Having been always clean-shaven, in 1878 he surprised his friends by growing a beard, writing in September to the conductor Bernhard Scholz: "I am coming with a large beard! Prepare your wife for a most awful sight." The singer George Henschel recalled that after a concert "I saw a man unknown to me, rather stout, of middle height, with long hair and a full beard. In a very deep and hoarse voice he introduced himself as 'Musikdirektor Müller' ... an instant later, we all found ourselves laughing heartily at the perfect success of Brahms's disguise". The incident also displays Brahms's love of practical jokes.

In 1882 Brahms completed his Piano Concerto No. 2, Op. 83, dedicated to his teacher Marxsen. Brahms was invited by Hans von Bülow to undertake a premiere of the work with the Meiningen Court Orchestra. This was the beginning of his collaboration with Meiningen and with von Bülow, who was to rank Brahms as one of the 'Three Bs'; in a letter to his wife he wrote: "You know what I think of Brahms: after Bach and Beethoven the greatest, the most sublime of all composers." The following years saw the premieres of his Third Symphony, Op. 90 (1883) and his Fourth Symphony, Op. 98 (1885). Richard Strauss, who had been appointed assistant to von Bülow at Meiningen, and had been uncertain about Brahms's music, found himself converted by the Third Symphony and was enthusiastic about the Fourth: "a giant work, great in concept and invention". Another, but cautious, supporter from the younger generation was Gustav Mahler who first met Brahms in 1884 and remained a close acquaintance; he rated Brahms as superior to Anton Bruckner, but more earth-bound than Wagner and Beethoven.

In 1889, Theo Wangemann, a representative of the American inventor Thomas Edison, visited the composer in Vienna and invited him to make an experimental recording. Brahms played an abbreviated version of his first Hungarian Dance and of Josef Strauss's Die Libelle on the piano. Although the spoken introduction to the short piece of music is quite clear, the piano playing is largely inaudible due to heavy surface noise.

In that same year, Brahms was named an honorary citizen of Hamburg.

Last years (1890–1897)

Brahms had become acquainted with Johann Strauss II, who was eight years his senior, in the 1870s, but their close friendship belongs to the years 1889 and after. Brahms admired much of Strauss's music, and encouraged the composer to sign up with his publisher Simrock. In autographing a fan for Strauss's wife Adele, Brahms wrote the opening notes of The Blue Danube waltz, adding the words "unfortunately not by Johannes Brahms".

After the successful Vienna premiere of his Second String Quintet, op. 111, in 1890, the 57-year-old Brahms came to think that he might retire from composition, telling a friend that he "had achieved enough; here I had before me a carefree old age and could enjoy it in peace." He also began to find solace in escorting the mezzo-soprano Alice Barbi and may have proposed to her (she was only 28). His admiration for Richard Mühlfeld, clarinettist with the Meiningen orchestra, revived his interest in composing and led him to write the Clarinet Trio, Op. 114 (1891); Clarinet Quintet, Op. 115 (1891); and the two Clarinet Sonatas, Op. 120 (1894). Brahms also wrote at this time his final cycles of piano pieces, Opp. 116–119 and the Vier ernste Gesänge (Four Serious Songs), Op. 121 (1896) which were prompted by the death of Clara Schumann and dedicated to the artist Max Klinger who was his great admirer. The last of the Eleven Chorale Preludes for organ, Op. 122 (1896) is a setting of "O Welt ich muss dich lassen" ("O world I must leave thee") and is the last notes that Brahms wrote. Many of these works were written in his house in Bad Ischl, where Brahms had first visited in 1882 and where he spent every summer from 1889 onwards.

In the summer of 1896 Brahms was diagnosed with jaundice, and later in the year his Viennese doctor diagnosed him with cancer of the liver (from which his father Jakob had died). His last public appearance was on 7 March 1897 when he saw Hans Richter conduct his Symphony No. 4; there was an ovation after each of the four movements. He made the effort, three weeks before his death, to attend the premiere of Johann Strauss's operetta Die Göttin der Vernunft (The Goddess of Reason) in March 1897. His condition gradually worsened and he died on 3 April 1897, in Vienna, aged 63. Brahms is buried in the Vienna Central Cemetery in Vienna, under a monument designed by Victor Horta with sculpture by Ilse von Twardowski.

Music

Style and influences

Brahms maintained a classical sense of form and order in his works, in contrast to the opulence of the music of many of his contemporaries. Thus, many admirers (though not necessarily Brahms himself) saw him as the champion of traditional forms and "pure music", as opposed to the "New German" embrace of programme music.

Brahms venerated Beethoven; in the composer's home, a marble bust of Beethoven looked down on the spot where he composed, and some passages in his works are reminiscent of Beethoven's style. Brahms's First Symphony bears strongly the influence of Beethoven's Fifth Symphony, as the two works are both in C minor and end in the struggle towards a C major triumph. The main theme of the finale of the First Symphony is also reminiscent of the main theme of the finale of Beethoven's Ninth, and when this resemblance was pointed out to Brahms he replied that any dunce could see that. In 1876, when the work was premiered in Vienna, it was immediately hailed as "Beethoven's Tenth". Indeed, the similarity of Brahms's music to that of late Beethoven had first been noted as early as November 1853 in a letter from Albert Dietrich to Ernst Naumann.

Brahms was a master of counterpoint. "For Brahms, ... the most complicated forms of counterpoint were a natural means of expressing his emotions," writes Geiringer. "As Palestrina or Bach succeeded in giving spiritual significance to their technique, so Brahms could turn a canon in motu contrario or a canon per augmentationem into a pure piece of lyrical poetry." Writers on Brahms have commented on his use of counterpoint. For example, of Op. 9, Variations on a Theme by Robert Schumann, Geiringer writes that Brahms "displays all the resources of contrapuntal art". In the A major piano quartet Opus 26, Jan Swafford notes that the third movement is "demonic-canonic, echoing Haydn's famous minuet for string quartet called the 'Witch's Round. Swafford further opines that "thematic development, counterpoint, and form were the dominant technical terms in which Brahms ... thought about music".

Allied to his skill in counterpoint was his subtle handling of rhythm and meter.  The New Grove Dictionary of Music speculates that his contact with Hungarian and gypsy folk music as a teenager led to "his lifelong fascination with the irregular rhythms, triplet figures and use of rubato" in his compositions. The Hungarian Dances are among Brahms's most-appreciated pieces. According to  "only one composer rivals him in the advanced nature of his rhythmic thinking, and that is Stravinsky."

His consummate skills in counterpoint and rhythm are richly present in A German Requiem, a work that was partially inspired by his mother's death in 1865 (at which time he composed a funeral march that was to become the basis of Part Two, "Denn alles Fleisch"), but which also incorporates material from a symphony which he started in 1854 but abandoned following Schumann's suicide attempt. He once wrote that the Requiem "belonged to Schumann". The first movement of this abandoned symphony was re-worked as the first movement of the First Piano Concerto.

Brahms loved the classical composers Mozart and Haydn. He especially admired Mozart, so much so that in his final years, he reportedly declared Mozart as the greatest composer. On 10 January 1896, Brahms conducted the Academic Festival Overture and both piano concertos in Berlin, and during the following celebration, Brahms interrupted Joachim's toast with "Ganz recht; auf Mozart's Wohl" (Quite right; here's Mozart's health). Brahms also compared Mozart with Beethoven to the latter's disadvantage, in a letter to Richard Heuberger, in 1896: "Dissonance, true dissonance as Mozart used it, is not to be found in Beethoven. Look at Idomeneo. Not only is it a marvel, but as Mozart was still quite young and brash when he wrote it, it was a completely new thing. You couldn't commission great music from Beethoven since he created only lesser works on commission—his more conventional pieces, his variations and the like." Brahms collected first editions and autographs of Mozart and Haydn's works and edited performing editions. He studied the music of pre-classical composers, including Giovanni Pierluigi da Palestrina, Giovanni Gabrieli, Johann Adolph Hasse, Heinrich Schütz, Domenico Scarlatti, George Frideric Handel, and, especially, Johann Sebastian Bach. His friends included leading musicologists, and, with Friedrich Chrysander, he edited an edition of the works of François Couperin. Brahms also edited works by C. P. E. Bach and W. F. Bach. He looked to older music for inspiration in the art of counterpoint; the themes of some of his works are modelled on Baroque sources such as Bach's The Art of Fugue in the fugal finale of Cello Sonata No. 1 or the same composer's Cantata No. 150 in the passacaglia theme of the Fourth Symphony's finale. Peter Phillips hears affinities between Brahms's rhythmically charged contrapuntal textures and those of Renaissance masters such as Giovanni Gabrieli and William Byrd. Referring to Byrd's Though Amaryllis dance, Philips remarks that "the cross-rhythms in this piece so excited E. H. Fellowes that he likened them to Brahms's compositional style."

The early Romantic composers had a major influence on Brahms, particularly Schumann, who encouraged Brahms as a young composer. During his stay in Vienna in 1862–63, Brahms became particularly interested in the music of Franz Schubert. The latter's influence may be identified in works by Brahms dating from the period, such as the two piano quartets Op. 25 and Op. 26, and the Piano Quintet which alludes to Schubert's String Quintet and Grand Duo for piano four hands. The influence of Chopin and Mendelssohn on Brahms is less obvious, although occasionally one can find in his works what seems to be an allusion to one of theirs (for example, Brahms's Scherzo, Op. 4, alludes to Chopin's Scherzo in B-flat minor; the scherzo movement in Brahms's Piano Sonata in F minor, Op. 5, alludes to the finale of Mendelssohn's Piano Trio in C minor).

Brahms considered giving up composition when it seemed that other composers' innovations in extended tonality resulted in the rule of tonality being broken altogether. Although Wagner became fiercely critical of Brahms as the latter grew in stature and popularity, he was enthusiastically receptive of the early Variations and Fugue on a Theme by Handel; Brahms himself, according to many sources, deeply admired Wagner's music, confining his ambivalence only to the dramaturgical precepts of Wagner's theory.

Brahms wrote settings for piano and voice of 144 German folk songs, and many of his lieder reflect folk themes or depict scenes of rural life.

Works

Brahms wrote a number of major works for orchestra, including four symphonies, two piano concertos (No. 1 in D minor; No. 2 in B-flat major), a Violin Concerto, a Double Concerto for violin and cello, and the Tragic Overture, along with somewhat lesser orchestral pieces such as the two Serenades, and the Academic Festival Overture.

His large choral work A German Requiem is not a setting of the liturgical Missa pro defunctis but a setting of texts which Brahms selected from the Luther Bible. The work was composed in three major periods of his life. An early version of the second movement was first composed in 1854, not long after Robert Schumann's attempted suicide, and this was later used in his first piano concerto. The majority of the Requiem was composed after his mother's death in 1865. The fifth movement was added after the official premiere in 1868, and the work was published in 1869.

His works in variation form include the Variations and Fugue on a Theme by Handel and the Paganini Variations, both for solo piano, and the Variations on a Theme by Haydn (now sometimes called the Saint Anthony Variations) in versions for two pianos and for orchestra. The final movement of the Fourth Symphony, Op. 98, is a passacaglia. He set a number of folksongs.

His chamber works include three string quartets, two string quintets, two string sextets, a clarinet quintet, a clarinet trio, a horn trio, a piano quintet, three piano quartets, and four piano trios (the fourth being published posthumously). He composed several instrumental sonatas with piano, including three for violin, two for cello, and two for clarinet (which were subsequently arranged for viola by the composer). His solo piano works range from his early piano sonatas and ballades to his late sets of character pieces. Brahms was a significant Lieder composer, who wrote over 200 of them. His chorale preludes for organ, Op. 122, which he wrote shortly before his death, have become an important part of the organ repertoire. They were published posthumously in 1902. The last of this set is a setting of the choral. "O Welt ich muss dich lassen" ("O world I now must leave thee") and were the last notes he wrote.

Brahms was an extreme perfectionist. He destroyed many early works – including a violin sonata he had performed with Reményi and violinist Ferdinand David – and once claimed to have destroyed 20 string quartets before he issued his official First in 1873. Over the course of several years, he changed an original project for a symphony in D minor into his first piano concerto. In another instance of devotion to detail, he laboured over the official First Symphony for almost fifteen years, from about 1861 to 1876. Even after its first few performances, Brahms destroyed the original slow movement and substituted another before the score was published.

A factor that contributed to his perfectionism was Schumann's early enthusiasm, which Brahms was determined to live up to.

Brahms strongly preferred writing absolute music that does not refer to an explicit scene or narrative, and he never wrote an opera or a symphonic poem.

Influence

Brahms looked both backward and forward; his output was often bold in its exploration of harmony and rhythm. As a result, he was an influence on composers of both conservative and modernist tendencies. Within his lifetime, his idiom left an imprint on several composers within his personal circle, who strongly admired his music, such as Heinrich von Herzogenberg, Robert Fuchs, and Julius Röntgen, as well as on Gustav Jenner, who was his only formal composition pupil. Antonín Dvořák, who received substantial assistance from Brahms, deeply admired his music and was influenced by it in several works, such as the Symphony No. 7 in D minor and the F minor Piano Trio. Features of the "Brahms style" were absorbed in a more complex synthesis with other contemporary (chiefly Wagnerian) trends by Hans Rott, Wilhelm Berger, Max Reger and Franz Schmidt, whereas the British composers Hubert Parry and Edward Elgar and the Swede Wilhelm Stenhammar all testified to learning much from Brahms. As Elgar said, "I look at the Third Symphony of Brahms, and I feel like a pygmy."

Ferruccio Busoni's early music shows much Brahmsian influence, and Brahms took an interest in him, though Busoni later tended to disparage Brahms. Towards the end of his life, Brahms offered substantial encouragement to Ernst von Dohnányi and to Alexander von Zemlinsky. Their early chamber works (and those of Béla Bartók, who was friendly with Dohnányi) show a thoroughgoing absorption of the Brahmsian idiom. Zemlinsky, moreover, was in turn the teacher of Arnold Schoenberg, and Brahms was apparently impressed by drafts of two movements of Schoenberg's early Quartet in D major which Zemlinsky showed him in 1897. In 1933, Schoenberg wrote an essay "Brahms the Progressive" (re-written 1947), which drew attention to his fondness for motivic saturation and irregularities of rhythm and phrase; in his last book (Structural Functions of Harmony, 1948), he analysed Brahms's "enriched harmony" and exploration of remote tonal regions. These efforts paved the way for a re-evaluation of his reputation in the 20th century. Schoenberg went so far as to orchestrate one of Brahms's piano quartets. Schoenberg's pupil Anton Webern, in his 1933 lectures, posthumously published under the title The Path to the New Music, claimed Brahms as one who had anticipated the developments of the Second Viennese School, and Webern's own Op. 1, an orchestral passacaglia, is clearly in part a homage to, and development of, the variation techniques of the passacaglia-finale of Brahms's Fourth Symphony. Ann Scott has shown how Brahms anticipated the procedures of the serialists by redistributing melodic fragments between instruments, as in the first movement of the Clarinet Sonata, Op. 120, No. 2.

Brahms was honoured in the German hall of fame, the Walhalla memorial. On 14 September 2000, he was introduced there as the 126th "rühmlich ausgezeichneter Teutscher" and 13th composer among them, with a bust by sculptor .

Instruments 
Brahms played principally on German and Viennese pianos. In his early years he used a piano made by the Hamburg company Baumgarten & Heins. Later, in 1864, he wrote to Clara Schumann about his attraction to instruments by Streicher. In 1873 he received a Streicher piano op. 6713 and kept it in his house until his death. He wrote to Clara: "There [on my Streicher] I always know exactly what I write and why I write one way or another." Another instrument in Brahms's possession was a Conrad Graf piano – a wedding present of the Schumanns, that Clara Schumann later gave to Brahms and which he kept until 1873.

In the 1880s for his public performances Brahms used a Bösendorfer several times. In his Bonn concerts he played on a Steinweg Nachfolgern in 1880 and a Blüthner in 1883. Brahms also used a Bechstein in several of his concerts: 1872 in Würzburg, 1872 in Cologne and 1881 in Amsterdam.

Beliefs
Brahms was baptised into the Lutheran church as an infant, and was confirmed at the age of fifteen (at St. Michael's Church, Hamburg), but has been described as an agnostic and a humanist. The devout Catholic Antonín Dvořák wrote in a letter: "Such a man, such a fine soul – and he believes in nothing! He believes in nothing!" When asked by conductor Karl Reinthaler to add additional explicitly religious text to his German Requiem, Brahms is reported to have responded, "As far as the text is concerned, I confess that I would gladly omit even the word German and instead use Human; also with my best knowledge and will I would dispense with passages like John 3:16. On the other hand, I have chosen one thing or another because I am a musician, because I needed it, and because with my venerable authors I can't delete or dispute anything. But I had better stop before I say too much."

References

Citations

Sources
 
 
 
 
 
 
 
 
  In 
 
 
 )

External links 

 Brahms Institut, Lübeck Academy of Music
 
 
 Free scores Mutopia Project
 
 Texts and translations of vocal music by Brahms, LiederNet Archive
 
 Listings of live performances, Bachtrack
 Johannes Brahms WebSource
Digitised recordings at the British Library Sounds

 
1833 births
1897 deaths
19th-century classical composers
19th-century classical pianists
19th-century German composers
19th-century German male musicians
19th-century organists
Burials at the Vienna Central Cemetery
Composers for piano
Composers for pipe organ
Composers from Vienna
German agnostics
German classical organists
German classical pianists
German emigrants to Austria
German humanists
German male classical composers
German male classical pianists
German male organists
German Romantic composers
Honorary Members of the Royal Philharmonic Society
Male classical organists
Musicians from Hamburg
Pupils of Eduard Marxsen
Recipients of the Pour le Mérite (civil class)